Amunugama Gedara Ranaweera Mudiyanselage Daminda Kumara Ranaweera, or commonly Daminda Ranaweera (born 29 February 1980) is a former Sri Lankan cricketer. He made his FC debut on 15 November 1999 for the Kurunegala Youth Cricket Club, against Colombo.

Early life 
Ranaweera was born on 29 February 1980 in Kandy, Sri Lanka. Ranaweera was raised into a Buddhist Sri Lankan family, and started playing cricket at an early age. He then started attending Vidyartha College at the age of 15 during the 1995/96 school year. Upon attending Vidyartha, Ranaweera played for his college's cricket team from 1997 to 1999.

Career

Kurunegala (1999-2001) 
Following Ranaweera's performances with Vidyartha in the 1998-99 Elephant Lemonade Cup, Ranaweera was selected to play for the Kurunegala Youth Cricket Club during the 1999-2000 Premier Trophy season. Ranaweera made his FC debut on 13 November 1999, against Colombo, wherein the match was drawn. He would go on to amass a total of 138 runs in 4 matches, with a high score of 71 during the trophy. Ranaweera was also selected by Kurunegala for the 1999-2000 Premier Limited Overs Tournament, where he made his LA debut on 26 February 2000, against the Nondescripts Cricket Club. He would go on to score 63 runs in 5 matches, with a high score of 50.

Colombo (2001-2004)

Tamil Union (2004-2006)

Colombo (2006-2011)

Bloomfield (2011-2013)

Cricket abroad (2014-2016)

Coaching stint (2016-2019)

Return to cricket (2019-2021)

Move to U.S. (2021-2022)

References 

Living people
1980 births
Sri Lankan cricketers
Cricketers from Kandy